Bratz is an American fashion doll and media franchise created by former Mattel employee Carter Bryant for MGA Entertainment, which debuted in 2001.

The four original 10-inch (25 cm) dolls were released on May 21, 2001 — Yasmin, Cloe, Jade, and Sasha. They featured almond-shaped eyes adorned with eye shadow and lush and big glossy lips. Bratz reached great success with the expansion to spin-offs, including Bratz Kidz, Bratz Boyz, Bratz Babyz and Bratzillaz'and a media franchise consisting of discography and adaptations into a TV series, a web series, a live-action film and video games. Global sales of the entire franchise grossed $2 billion in 2005 and by the following year, the brand had about 40 percent of the fashion-doll market.

The Bratz doll lines have provoked controversy in several areas from their stylized proportions to fashion-forward clothing, capitalizing closely on pop trends. Since the brand's launch in 2001, franchise distributor MGA Entertainment got embroiled in a lengthy legal dispute with Mattel over the rights to its design, which ended in 2011 with MGA as the victors. Related litigation is ongoing in a lawsuit by MGA alleging Mattel's theft of trade secrets.

MGA has paused the Bratz brand since the onset of the litigation and rebranded it several times throughout its lifespan, with the first of those coming in 2010 after Mattel's first lawsuit, only to return later that year to commemorate the brand's 10th anniversary. In 2013, Bratz changed to have a taller bodies, an all-new logo and branding, and continued through 2014, in an effort to return the brand to its roots. As a result, none of the 2014 product line was made available in North America.

In July 2015, Bratz relaunched a second time with new doll lines and introducing a new main character, Raya, to the debut lineup from its 2001 launch as well as a new slogan and website design. The bodies were changed to be 10" (25 cm) tall again, but with new bodies and head molds. These dolls were met with negative reactions from fans, as the brand was more oriented towards younger kids rather than tweens and teens like the previous dolls. Due to the poor reception and sales, the dolls were once again discontinued in 2016.

In September 2018, a new line of dolls titled "Bratz Collector" were designed by fashion illustrator Hayden Williams and released exclusively on Amazon. The brand featured closely resemblance to the original 2001 doll line. In June 2021, for its 20th anniversary, Bratz released near-replicas of the debut dolls from its 2001 launch.

Products and history

Though Bratz dolls fared poorly at their May 21, 2001 debut — mostly due to the long-held monopoly by the Mattel-staple Barbie — their popularity increased the following Christmas. In the first half-decade since debut, 125 million products were sold worldwide, and, in 2005, global sales of Bratz and Bratz products grossed over $2 billion. In 2006, a toy-industry analyst indicated Bratz had captured about forty percent of the fashion-doll market, compared with Barbie's sixty percent. The competition was high with Barbies, but became more and more popular with time.

The success of the original four dolls generated a quartet of similar dolls between 2002 and 2003. Sets of twins were also introduced. The dolls were sold separately and in themed environments. Accessories such as playsets, furniture, and cars were also released, as well as a media franchise composed of films, discography, video games and interactive DVDs.

In August 2010, MGA released its first Bratz dolls in a year to celebrate the 10th anniversary/first decadial anniversary of the franchise. In addition to two "comeback" collections, MGA also released 10 new female Bratz characters on 10 October 2010. Bratz Party and Talking Bratz were in Target, Toys "R" Us and Walmart stores.

In 2013, Bratz got a new logo and slogan, and the dolls all got new bodies with articulated arms, with a height to match its competitor Monster High while keeping their unique faces, and sporting brand new fashions. Only the four principal Bratz characters, alongside Meygan, Fianna, Shira, Roxxi and Phoebe, have been made in the new bodies.

In January 2014, MGA revealed that Bratz would go on a country-based hiatus (only for/in the United States) for a year in an attempt to rebuild the brand after an admittedly first relaunch in September 2010 to celebrate the brand's first decadial anniversary, resulting from the lawsuit against Mattel, which was met with decreased popularity. MGA Entertainment felt that it wanted to give the brand "the comeback it truly deserved".

The Bratz relaunched a second time in July, 2015 with the introduction of Raya, a new character (despite sharing the same name with a previous character), to accompany the original main four. The Bratz logo was reverted to the original and a new slogan was adopted. After a poorly executed re-branding and low sales, the brand discontinued for a second time the following year.

On 20 May 2017, MGA Entertainment CEO, Isaac Larian, announced a third relaunch of the brand in Autumn/Fall 2018, in addition to announcing a collaboration with fashion designer Hayden Williams. Since Black Friday of 2018, the new set of Bratz Collector dolls designed by Hayden Williams were officially released and sold exclusively through Amazon.

Bratz turned 20 in 2021. The first line of Cool Bratz dolls had an official release date of May 21, 2001.

Spin-offs
The original line of dolls has generated a number of spin-offs such as Lil' Bratz, Bratz Boyz, Bratz Kidz, Bratz Babyz, Itsy Bitsy Bratz, Bratz Lil' Angelz, Be-Bratz, and Bratz Petz.

Two Bratz Boyz were released in 2002 with others debuting in 2003, 2007, and 2008. Bratz also includes Bratz Boyz and Boyz Twiinz.

Lil' Bratz (2002) are miniature versions of the original five Bratz and eventually included Lil' Boyz based on the Bratz Boyz. In 2007, a clothing line was released titled Lil' Bratz Couture.

Bratz Babyz debuted on 22 August 2004, with infant accessories such as bottles and blankets. Characters from the regular Bratz line have been released as Babyz. Bratz Lil' Angelz (2007) are the newborn, collectible version of Bratz Babyz. Smaller than regular Bratz Babyz, they include their own newborn pets.

Bratz Petz debuted in 2004 and was discontinued in 2006. They were plush toys resembling foxes, cats, and dogs with their own bags, clothes, and accessories. Bratz Petz have been re-released in Australia and the U.K. with bobble heads and accessories.

Bratz Kidz, the "kid" equivalent of the teenaged Bratz dolls, were introduced in 2006. The dolls were 6″ (15 cm) tall and, thus, shorter than the regular Bratz. Bratz Boyz Kidz are introduced in 2007 starring four of the Bratz Boyz. Soon after the release of the Bratz Boyz Kidz, the clothing was changed from fabric to plastic snap-ons.

Be-Bratz dolls (2007) were designed for owner customization. With a Be-Bratz USB Key, the doll owner can take a Be-Bratz doll online, name it, and create an online social homepage. Games can be played with the Be-Bratz account to acquire accessories for the doll.

In September 2012, the Bratzillaz (House of Witchez) were released as a spin-off line, depicting the 'witch cousins' of the Bratz, capitalizing on the fresh popularity and cult following from the launch of Monster High by Mattel.

Controversies
The parental group Dads and Daughters were upset at the marketing of the Bratz Secret Date collection. The dolls were packaged with a Bratz girl in the right half of the box — either Cloe, Yasmin, Jade, Meygan, or Nevra — and matched with a mystery Boyz doll behind the door on the left. A window showing the doll's feet would provide a clue to which Boyz doll it was, especially important in the quest for a rare Bryce doll, available in only one of every 24 boxes. The group complained that the dolls' marketing was encouraging young girls to sneak out of the house and go on blind dates with strangers. It also took issue with accessory champagne bottles and glasses, but were later confirmed to be smoothie bottles. MGA later renamed the collection to Bratz Blind Date. 

On 21 December 2006, the National Labor Committee (now The Institute for Global Labour and Human Rights) announced that the factory workers behind Bratz dolls in China have labored for 94½ hours a week, while the factory paid only $0.515 an hour. The cost of labor per doll was $0.17. The retail price for a single doll ranges between $9.99 to $22.99, depending on the included items and specific retailer.

The allegations in the report describe practices found at many Chinese factories producing name-brand products for export. They include required overtime exceeding the legal maximum of 36 hours a month, forcing workers to stay on the job to meet stringent production quotas and the denial of paid sick leave and other benefits. The report shows copies of what it says are "cheat sheets" distributed to workers before auditors from Walmart or other customers arrive to make sure the factory passes inspections intended to ensure the supplier meets labor standards. It said workers at the factory intended to go on strike in January 2007 to protest plans by factory managers to put all employees on temporary contracts, denying them legal protection required for long-term employees.

After the announcement, MGA Entertainment CEO, Isaac Larian sent a statement on 24 December 2006, via email to a dedicated franchise fansite, Bratz World, and another two days later to Playthings magazine stating that the information is false and the company is not familiar with the company named in the report and MGA uses "first-rate factories in the Orient" to make its goods, besides Mattel and Hasbro. Larian said that he never heard about the news or of "the organization who is behind this negative and false campaign immediately prior to the last holiday shopping weekend."

In 2007, concerns over the body image and lifestyle the Bratz dolls allegedly promoted were raised by the American Psychological Association after it established its Task Force on the Sexualization of Girls. In its published report, it cited concern over the adult-like sexuality the Bratz dolls allegedly portray. Another study found that for young African-American girls, the dolls' racial diversity was a more salient variable during play than their sexualized outfits. The controversy over alleged oversexualization of Bratz dolls for young girls was alluded to in a 2007 episode of Boston Legal titled "Guise n' Dolls." 

Bratz were not the only dolls to be criticized in this report, which highlighted not only toys but also other products and the wider media. In the United Kingdom, a Bratz spokesman defended the toy line, saying that "it is consumed by 8+-year-olds" and "are aimed at the preteen and teen market", adding that the dolls were considered for "female consumers at ages 10 to 18", with the focus on the dolls while on looks was not on "sexualization" and that "friendship was also a key focus" of Bratz dolls.

The spokesman quoted Dr. Brian Young of the University of Exeter, saying "parents may feel awkward but I don't think children see the dolls as sexy. They just think they're pretty." Isaac Larian, in comments given to the BBC, said that the report was a "bunch of garbage" and that the people who wrote it were "acting irresponsibly".

Legal issues
Since the 2001 launch of Bratz, sales of the Mattel, Inc.-staple Barbie fashion dolls began to decline. In 2004, sales figures showed that Bratz dolls outsold Barbie dolls in the United Kingdom and Australia, although Mattel maintained that in terms of the number of dolls, clothes, and accessories sold, Barbie remained the leading brand. In 2005, figures showed that sales of Barbie dolls had fallen by 30% in the United States, and by 18% worldwide, with much of the drop being attributed to the popularity of Bratz.

In April 2005, MGA Entertainment filed a lawsuit against Mattel, claiming that the "My Scene" line of Barbie dolls had copied the doe-eyed look of Bratz dolls. It added the word "only" to the toy line's slogan "The only girls with a passion for fashion" by attempting to isolate their dolls from Mattel's as many casual consumers confused the difference of two brands.

On 10 December 2006, Mattel sued MGA Entertainment for $500 million, alleging that the brand's creator, Carter Bryant, was working for Mattel when he developed its original idea/concept. On 17 July 2008, a federal jury ruled that Bryant had created the Bratz concept while he was working for Mattel, despite MGA's claim that Bryant had not been employed by Mattel at the time and Bryant's assertion that he had designed the Bratz concepts between two separate periods of employment at Mattel. The jury also ruled that MGA and its CEO Isaac Larian were liable for converting Mattel property for its own use and intentionally interfering with the contractual duties owed by Bryant to Mattel. On August 26, the jury decided that Mattel was to be paid just $100 million in damages, citing that only the first generation of Bratz had infringed on Mattel property and that MGA had innovated and evolved the product significantly enough that subsequent generations of Bratz could not be conclusively found to be infringing.

On 3 December 2008, U.S. District Judge Stephen G. Larson granted a permanent injunction requested by Mattel against MGA. Subsequently, on 10 December 2009, the U.S. Court of Appeals for the Ninth Circuit granted MGA an immediate stay of the injunction, thereby halting the impending recall of all Bratz products, ensuring that retailers would be allowed to continue to sell the Bratz products through at least the Court's final ruling on the matter. In its initial statement, the Court suggested Larson's previous ruling was "draconian" and had gone too far in awarding ownership of the entire Bratz franchise to Mattel. The Court of Appeals also ordered MGA and Mattel to resolve their dispute out of court. Isaac Larian stated in a statement from his company, MGA, that "the Court's stay is good news for all Bratz fans and for anyone who cares about fair competition."

On 22 July 2010, the Ninth Circuit Court of Appeals declared that ownership of the Bratz franchise belonged to MGA Entertainment. The Court Of Appeals rejected the District Court's original ruling for Mattel, where MGA Entertainment was ordered to forfeit the entire Bratz brand — including all registered copyrights and trademarks of the Bratz name — to Mattel. The panel from the Court of Appeals said Judge Larson had abused his discretion with his ruling for Mattel, concluding that Bryant's employment agreement could have, but did not necessarily, cover ideas as it did designs, processes, computer programs, and formulae, which are all more concrete.

In addition to the litigation for ownership and control of Bratz' on 20 October 2009, artist Bernard "Butch" Belair filed a new design infringement lawsuit against both Mattel and MGA in Manhattan federal court, seeking unspecified damages. Belair claimed that his copyright designs of young women with "large heads, oval eyes, small bodies and large feet," which he had created for shoe designer house Steve Madden, were "pilfered" when Carter Bryant, during his 2008 court testimony, testified that he had been inspired by Steve Madden shoe ads which he saw in Seventeen magazine. Belair says neither MGA nor Mattel "sought or obtained permission ... to copy, reproduce, create derivative works from or distribute" his "copyrighted" work. In 2011, MGA prevailed over Belair, with the summary judgment stateting that, "Belair cannot monopolize the abstract concept of an absurdly large-headed, long limbed, attractive, fashionable woman."

Mattel and MGA returned to court in January 2011 to renew its battle over who owns Bratz, which this time includes accusations from both companies that the other side stole trade secrets. In April 2011, a federal jury returned a verdict supporting MGA, with Mattel in August that year ordered by the same court to pay MGA $310 million for attorney fees, stealing trade secrets and false claims rather than the $88.5 million issued in April.

In July 2012, MGA Entertainment sued Lady Gaga for $10 million for causing, according to the BBC, "deliberate delays to the release of a doll based on her image."

The Ninth Circuit Court of Appeals vacated without prejudice the $170 million judgment from 2008 against Mattel on procedural grounds in January 2013. In 2014, MGA filed a complaint in a California state court, seeking in excess of $1 billion.

Media Franchising

Films
There have been a number of animated Bratz direct-to-video films, all of which initially were distributed by 20th Century Fox Home Entertainment and were later re-released through Lionsgate. Some of the films, including Bratz Go to Paris: The Movie is a re-released compilation of three Bratz episodes from the first season, consisting of "Go to Paris I / Bratz in Playland", "Go to Paris II / Bratz in Franceland", and "Go to Paris III / Bratz in Ragland". Bratz Babyz Save Christmas, initially released in 2008, was re-released by Lionsgate in 2013 as Bratz Babyz Save Christmas: The Movie. The live-action adaption of the franchise involving the four main characters exploring high school troubles and cliques was met with overwhelmingly negative reviews from critics including at Rotten Tomatoes with emphasis "full of mixed messages and dubious role-models", adding that "Bratz is too shallow even for its intended audience."

Bratz: Rock Angelz first premiered on Cartoon Network in the United States on October 4, 2005, as a television film, and later released on DVD by 20th Century Fox Home Entertainment (and later re-released by Lionsgate) the following week.

Traditional animation
 Bratz: Starrin' & Stylin' (August 3, 2004)
 Bratz Babyz: The Movie (September 12, 2006)

Computer animation/CGI
 Bratz: Rock Angelz (October 4, 2005)
 Bratz: Genie Magic (April 11, 2006)
 Bratz: Passion 4 Fashion – Diamondz/Bratz Forever Diamondz (September 26, 2006)
 Bratz: Fashion Pixiez (February 27, 2007)
 Bratz Kidz: Sleep-Over Adventure (July 31, 2007)
 Bratz: Super Babyz (October 9, 2007)
 Bratz Kidz: Fairy Tales (February 26, 2008)
 Bratz: Girlz Really Rock (September 22, 2008)
 Bratz Babyz Save Christmas (November 5, 2008)
 Bratz: Pampered Petz (October 5, 2010)
 Bratz: Desert Jewelz (January 10, 2012)
 Bratz: Go to Paris the Movie (October 8, 2013)
Live-action
 Bratz (August 3, 2007)

Television and web series

Bratz TV series

A CGI-animated TV series adaptation was produced by Mike Young Productions (now Splash Entertainment) and premiered in the United States on 4Kids TV.

Bratz: BFF (Best Friends Forever)
In August 2007, an 88-minute CGI-animated audiovisual production titled Bratz: BFF (Best Friends Forever) was released on the DVD rental website portal of Netflix.

Bratz Design Academy
From October 2008, Nickelodeon aired a reality show titled Bratz Design Academy, in which children aged 9 to 14 compete in fashion challenges similar to Project Runway, with the winner designing clothing for a British line of Bratz dolls.

Bratz Rock
On 10 October 2010, MGA premiered the first episode of an 11-episode web series titled Bratz Rock,  revolving around the main characters as they enter a music competition held by fictional music star Whisper, and as they get closer to finishing their song for the contest, they also uncover Whisper's true identity. On October 14, 2010, the series was announced as postponed, but the remaining episodes were never released.

Bratz Makin' The Band
On 24 January 2011, MGA hired Morgan Mendieta to create a teaser for an upcoming Bratz reality series. He leaked a rough cut of the teaser on his blog. The show, titled Bratz Makin' the Band, is an online talent competition reality show, in which Bratz fans will form bands and compete via the Bratz YouTube channel. The final five bands will be flown to Hollywood, California, where they will be followed and interviewed by reporters. The winners will receive various prizes, including electric guitars. The leaked teaser also confirmed the release of a Bratz DVD due out in fall 2011, also titled Bratz Makin' The Band.

Bratz (web series)

In August 2015, a stop-motion web series premiered on YouTube. MGA confirmed there would be 10 episodes for the first season, which would turn out to be the only season. All 10 episodes were compiled into a 25-minute video titled Bratz: Friends Forever on Netflix. The web series was seen on American TV on Kabillion.

Talking Bratz (web series)

In May 2021, Bratz announced via Twitter that a web series titled "Talking Bratz" would air exclusively on its TikTok. In a similar CGI-style animation to the original TV series which aired between 2005 and 2008, the series consisted of various Bratz characters being interviewed in a talk-show like studio. The series saw the return of two of the TV series cast in Olivia Hack and Ogie Banks.

Discography

 Bratz: Rock Angelz Soundtrack (2005)
 Bratz: Genie Magic Soundtrack (2006)
 Bratz: Forever Diamondz Soundtrack (2006)
 Bratz: The Motion Picture Soundtrack (2007)
 Bratz: Fashion Pixiez Soundtrack (2007)
 Bratz: Girlz Really Rock Soundtrack (2008)

Games

Interactive DVDs
 Livin' It Up with the Bratz (2006)
 Bratz: Glitz 'n' Glamour (2007)
 Lil' Bratz: Party Time! (2008)

Video games 

 Bratz (2002)
 Bratz: Rock Angelz (2005)
 Bratz: Forever Diamondz (2006)
 Bratz Babyz (2006)
 Lil' Bratz: Friends, Fashion and Fun (2006)
 Bratz: Fashion Pixies (2007)
 Bratz: The Movie (2007) 
 Bratz: 4 Real (2007)
 Bratz Kidz Slumber Party! (2008)
 Bratz: Super Babyz (2008)
 Bratz: Ponyz (2007) 
 Bratz: Ponyz 2 (2008)
 Bratz: Girlz Really Rock (2008)
 Bratz: Fashion Boutique (2012)
 Bratz: Action Heroez (2013)
 Bratz: C.I.Y. Shoppe (2015)
 Bratz: Total Fashion Makeover (2021)
 Bratz: Flaunt Your Fashion (2022)

References

External links
 

 
Products introduced in 2001
Animated musical groups
Fashion dolls
Fictional musical groups
Teenage characters in television
Teenage characters in film
Teenage characters in animated films
MGA Entertainment brands
2000s toys
2010s toys
2001 establishments in the United States
Toy controversies